Domingos António da Silva (28 April 1937 – 25 August 2015), known as Mascarenhas, was an Angolan footballer who played as a forward.

Club career
Mascarenhas was born in Vila Salazar, Portuguese Angola. After one season with S.L. Benfica and three with F.C. Barreirense, he joined Sporting CP in 1962; during his three-year spell with the Lisbon club, he scored 80 goals in 107 matches all appearances comprised, even friendlies.

In the 1963 Portuguese Cup final, Mascarenhas scored once in a 4–0 victory over Vitória de Guimarães. The following campaign, in Sporting's victorious campaign in the UEFA Cup Winners' Cup, he netted six times in a 16–1 home rout of APOEL FC (European competition record), adding another in the final against MTK Budapest FC, the 3–3 leading to a replay in Antwerp which ended with a 1–0 win for the Lions.

Death
Mascarenhas died on 25 August 2015 at the São José Hospital in Lisbon, after a long illness. He was 78 years old.

References

External links

1937 births
2015 deaths
Angolan footballers
Association football forwards
Primeira Liga players
Liga Portugal 2 players
S.L. Benfica footballers
F.C. Barreirense players
Sporting CP footballers
G.D. Fabril players
G.D. Peniche players
G.D. Riopele players
F.C. Paços de Ferreira players
Angolan expatriate footballers
Expatriate footballers in Portugal
Angolan expatriate sportspeople in Portugal